The Order of People's Liberty was an Order of Merit of the Kingdom of Bulgaria from 1945 to 1946, and of the People's Republic of Bulgaria from 1946 to 1990. Originally it consisted of simply a breast star, but later became issued as a breast badge.

References

Orders, decorations, and medals of Bulgaria